Les Crane (born Lesley Stein; December 3, 1933 – July 13, 2008) was a radio announcer and television talk show host, a pioneer in interactive broadcasting who also scored a spoken word hit with his 1971 recording of the poem Desiderata, winning a "Best Spoken Word" Grammy.  He was the first network television personality to compete with Johnny Carson after Carson became a fixture of late-night television.

Biography

Early life
Born in New York, Crane graduated from Tulane University, where he was an English major. He spent four years in the United States Air Force, as a jet pilot and helicopter flight instructor.

Radio
He began his radio career in 1958 at KONO in San Antonio and later worked at WPEN (now WKDN) in Philadelphia. In 1961, he became a popular and controversial host for the radio powerhouse KGO in San Francisco. With KGO's strong nighttime 50,000 watt signal reaching as far north as Seattle, and as far south as Los Angeles, he attracted a regional audience in the West. Variety described him as "the popular, confrontational and sometimes controversial host of San Francisco's KGO. Helping to pioneer talk radio, he was outspoken and outraged some callers by hanging up on them."

A late-night program airing weekdays from 11pm to 2am, Crane at the hungry i (1962–63) found Crane interacting with owner and impresario Enrico Banducci and interviewing such talents as Barbra Streisand and Professor Irwin Corey.

Crane, along with KRLA general manager John Barrett, were the original people "responsible for creating the Top 40 (list of the most requested pop songs)," said Casey Kasem in a 1990 interview.

Television

In 1963, Crane moved to New York City to host Night Line, a 1:00 a.m. talk show on WABC-TV, the American Broadcasting Company's flagship station. The first American TV appearance of The Rolling Stones was on Crane's program in June 1964 when only New Yorkers could see it. The program debuted nationwide with a trial run (telecast nightly for a week) in August 1964 starting at 11:15 p.m. on the ABC schedule and titled The New Les Crane Show. It originated in a television studio in midtown Manhattan.  Each episode was videotaped in advance, not live, with the length of the delay unknown decades later because research was not done when first-hand sources were alive. The New Les Crane Show was the first network program to compete with The Tonight Show Starring Johnny Carson, which originated in New York prior to 1972, also with a videotaped delay before each telecast.

ABC network officials used kinescopes of two episodes from the August 1964 trial run to pitch The New Les Crane Show to affiliates that had not yet signed up to carry the program. One episode featured the mother of Lee Harvey Oswald debating Oswald's guilt with noted attorney Melvin Belli, Crane and audience members. The other featured Norman Mailer and Richard Burton. Burton encouraged Crane to recite the "gravedigger speech" from Hamlet, and Crane did.

More affiliates signed up for a November relaunch of The Les Crane Show, and Look ran a prominent feature story with captioned still photographs from the August episodes. One image shows Shelley Winters debating a controversial issue with Jackie Robinson, May Craig and William F. Buckley.

While some critics found Crane's late-night series innovative (indeed, two and a half years later The Phil Donahue Show followed a similar format to much greater success on a local station in Dayton, Ohio during its daytime schedule), it never gained much of an audience.

In late June 1965, following Crane's three-month absence from television, The Les Crane Show was retitled ABC's Nightlife, sometimes advertised in newspapers as Nightlife, and it returned to the late-night schedule of the ABC network. Network executives removed most of the controversy and emphasized light entertainment. Producer Nick Vanoff started forbidding guests from broaching controversial topics. After the summer 1965 run ended, network executives relocated the show from New York to Los Angeles, and the fall season began there. The Paley Center for Media has available for viewing the first 15 minutes of one of the last episodes before executives finally cancelled ABC's Nightlife in early November 1965. Crane can be seen and heard delivering his monologue, joking about words that could be censored and bantering with his sidekick Nipsey Russell.

The two kinescopes that ABC used to pitch The Les Crane Show to its affiliates in 1964 constitute most of the surviving video and audio of Crane's show.  The UCLA Film and Television Archive has a digitized collection of clips from the Les Crane Show early episodes in August 1964. It was assembled using 16 millimeter editing equipment, probably so network executives could use the collection of clips, in addition to the two entire episodes, to pitch the show to affiliates around the United States who had not yet signed up to carry the show.

An archive of source material on Malcolm X has only the audio of the civil rights leader's December 1964 appearance with Crane. Their conversation starts with Crane saying he has interviewed  Malcolm before. Details of their previous encounter are unknown. Audio of Bob Dylan's February 17, 1965 appearance is circulated online, and transcribed.  Videotape of that broadcast was erased but still photographs and a snippet in silent 8mm film survive. At least two YouTube uploads include the best possible reconstruction of the telecast.

The National Archives has a transcript of the August 1964 Oswald/Belli episode in its documents related to the JFK assassination that were declassified and released publicly in 1993 and 1994. Crane's daughter Caprice Crane has said she believes her father saved until he died a kinescope of this entire episode.

The collection culled from various episodes (preserved digitally at UCLA Film and Television Archive) includes a short clip from the episode with Shelley Winters, Jackie Robinson, May Craig and William F. Buckley. Several people seem to be ridiculing Winters, and the studio audience cheers efforts to keep her quiet after she voices her opinion of presidential candidate Barry Goldwater.  A transcript of the rest of this episode does not exist, and what the participants said during the remainder is unknown.  The collection excludes Malcolm X, evidently because the collection has only clips from August 1964, and he appeared in December 1964.

Les Crane's confrontational interview technique, along with a "shotgun microphone" he aimed at audiences, earned him the name "the bad boy of late-night television." The profile in the Look magazine edition of November 3, 1964 called him "television's new bad boy," but critical opinion was divided. The New York Times''' media critic Paul Gardner considered him an incisive interviewer who asked tough questions without being insulting. One critic who did not like his show found Crane's trademark shotgun microphone distracting. "Each time he points this mike into the audience, it looks as though he's about to shoot a spectator." (Laurent, 1964) Nearly every critic described Crane as photogenic. One described him as "a tall, handsome and personable lad..." (Smith, 1964)

Crane was unable to dent Carson's ratings, and his show lasted 14 weeks before ABC executives transformed it into the more show-business-oriented ABC's Nightlife.

In addition to Dylan, who rarely appeared on American television, Malcolm X and Richard Burton, Crane's guests on The Les Crane Show included Martin Luther King Jr., Ayn Rand, Judy Collins, Sam Levene, George Wallace, Robert F. Kennedy, and the voice of radio's The Shadow, Bret Morrison.

Immediately after the November 1965 cancellation of ABC's Nightlife, Crane tried acting, but his career was brief.  He appeared in the unsuccessful film An American Dream (1966), which was based on the Norman Mailer novel, and made a few guest-star appearances on network television shows, including a 1966 appearance on the western series The Virginian.

Folksinger Phil Ochs mentioned Crane in the lyrics of his satirical 1966 song "Love Me, I'm a Liberal".

Some sources say that Crane gave the rock group The Mamas and the Papas their name, but this is disputed in other sources, including John Phillips' 1986 memoir, which says he and Cass Elliot (both founding members of the group) came up with the name while they were watching a television news segment about the Hells Angels. In a radio interview, year unknown, that Elliot did after the 1968 disbanding of the group, she says the following:  "We were watching this special on the Hell's Angels and one of the guys, Les Crane or somebody, asked them, uh, 'What do you call your women?'  And this guy said, 'Well, some call 'em cheap but we call 'em mamas.'  And it became a gag.  You know, well, if the mamas would cook the dinner, the papas would go out and get the cat food.  And it became the Mamas and the Papas."

Les Crane was known as an advocate for civil rights, and was praised by black journalists for his respectful interviews with such black newsmakers as Martin Luther King, Malcolm X and Muhammad Ali (Young, 1968).

Crane was one of the first interviewers to have an openly gay guest, Randy Wicker, on his television show.  This occurred in January 1964, when Crane's show that was titled Night Line aired locally on WABC Channel 7 in New York City. But when Crane tried to invite members of a lesbian advocacy group, the Daughters of Bilitis, to be guests on Night Line in June 1964 when it was still a local show, WABC officials ordered him to cancel the booking, and he did.

After Crane's final television appearance in the early 1970s, he refused to discuss his television career and did not respond to queries about any kinescopes he may have owned of his late-night ABC show from 1964.

His daughter Caprice Crane has said he had two August 1964 episodes in their entirety:  the one with Richard Burton that is represented by a large still photograph of Burton and Crane in Crane's Look magazine profile (Norman Mailer supposedly appears in the episode, too), and the one in which Melvin Belli debates Lee Oswald's guilt with Lee's mother Marguerite.

When Caprice was informed about the reel of clips from a handful of episodes that can be viewed at the UCLA Film and Television Archive, she replied that she had never seen it and she did not know whether her father was ever aware of it.

Later career

In 1967 Crane tried his hand at acting, starring as Jack, the leader of the three detectives in I Love a Mystery, a pilot film film for a proposed series based on the popular radio show.  The series wasn't developed, and the movie didn't air until 1973.

In 1968, Les Crane was hosting a radio talk show on KLAC in Los Angeles. Critics noted that in the style of the 1960s, he now dressed in a turtleneck and moccasins, sprinkling his speech with words like "groovy." ("Communicasters," 1968). However, he was still doing interviews with major newsmakers and discussing topics like civil disobedience, hippies and the rising popularity of meditation. (Sweeney, 1968) He also did some local TV talk. Crane left KLAC when the station switched to a country music format.

In late 1971, the 45rpm recording of Crane's reading of Desiderata reached No. 8 on the Billboard charts. It became what one writer called "a New Age anthem" and won him a Grammy.

Though Crane thought the poem was in the public domain when it was recorded, the rights belonged to the family of author Max Ehrmann, and royalties were distributed accordingly. When asked about the recording during an interview by the Los Angeles Times in 1987, Crane replied, "I can't listen to it now without gagging."

In the 1980s, Crane transitioned to the software industry and became chairman of The Software Toolworks, creators of the three-dimensional color chess series, Chessmaster and the educational series Mavis Beacon Teaches Typing. Toolworks was also responsible for such games as The Original Adventure and the PC version of Pong. The company was sold and renamed Mindscape in the early 1990s.

Marriages
Crane was married five times.  The 1964 Look magazine profile includes a photograph of him with his wife Eve, maiden name King, on the lawn of their home in Oyster Bay, Long Island. The text of the article says he is helping raise her three children from her previous marriage that had ended in divorce.

Crane's fourth wife was Gilligan's Island cast member Tina Louise, whom he married in 1966 and divorced in 1971.  Their only child together was Caprice Crane (b. 1970), who became an author, screenwriter and television producer.

Les Crane and Tina Louise can be seen as actors in a joint appearance on a 1969 segment of Love, American Style.

Death
Crane died on July 13, 2008, in Greenbrae, California, north of San Francisco, at age 74. At the time of his death, he had been living in nearby Belvedere, California with his wife Tina.

Notes

References
Bronson, Fred.  "The Mamas and the Papas."  Billboard Book of Number One Hits (p. 198) New York: Billboard Books, 2003.
"Communicasters: Les Crane."  Los Angeles Times, March 24, 1968, p. B13.
Gardner, Paul.  "Television: Les Crane's New Program."  The New York Times, August 4, 1964, p. 59.
Laurent, Lawrence.  "Les Crane's Show Lacks Controversy."  The Washington Post, November 24, 1964, p. C6.
Lowry, Cynthia.  "Insomnia Cure: Les Crane?"  Chicago Tribune, November 8, 1964, p. S7.
Smith, Cecil.  "Crane Flying High Nightly."  Los Angeles Times, August 5, 1964, p. C14.
Sweeney, Louise.  "Television's Talk, Talk, Talkathons on the Late Late Shows."  The Christian Science Monitor, March 8, 1968, p. 4.
Young, A.S. "Muhammad on TV."  The Chicago Defender, July 23, 1968, p. 24.
Loughery, John (1998). The Other Side of Silence – Men's Lives and Gay Identities: A Twentieth-Century History''. New York, Henry Holt and Company. .

External links

1933 births
2008 deaths
American radio DJs
Television personalities from California
Grammy Award winners
Radio personalities from New York City
Tulane University alumni
United States Air Force officers
20th-century American musicians
People from Belvedere, California
American flight instructors
Aviators from New York (state)
Military personnel from California